KHKI (97.3 MHz) is a commercial FM radio station in Des Moines, Iowa. The station is owned by Cumulus Media and airs a country music radio format known as "97.3 Nash FM."  On weekdays, local DJs are heard during the day, while in the evening, KHKI airs two nationally syndicated Nash FM programs from parent company Cumulus, including "Nash Nights Live" and "The Blair Garner Show."   On weekends, "Bob Kingsley's Country Top 40" is heard.

KHKI's studios are in Urbandale, Iowa, with other Cumulus Des Moines stations: KJJY, KGGO, KWQW, and KBGG. Its transmitter is located on Northwest 100th Street on the border between Grimes and Johnston.  While the maximum power for most FM stations in Iowa is 100,000 watts, KHKI's effective radiated power (ERP) is slightly higher, at 105,000 watts; because KHKI dates back to 1961, it is grandfathered at the higher output.

History
The station first signed on the air in February 1961 as KDMI.  It was owned by Richards & Associates, Inc.  There was no AM counterpart.  KDMI was a rare stand-alone FM station in an era when few people owned FM radios.  From the 1970s to the early 1990s, KDMI aired a Christian radio format.

In 1993, the station was acquired by American Radio Systems, flipping to a country music format.  It switched its call sign to KHKI, billing itself as "97.3 KHKI, Hawkeye Country."  The "Hawkeye" branding referred to the team name for the University of Iowa, the Hawkeyes.  Later, it shortened the moniker to "The Hawk 97-3" before becoming "97.3 The Hawk."  On May 24, 2013, KHKI became "Nash FM 97.3" as part of Cumulus' plan to convert most of its 84 Country-formatted properties to the "Nash FM" brand.

References

External links
Official Site

List of "grandfathered" FM radio stations in the U.S.

Country radio stations in the United States
Cumulus Media radio stations
Radio stations established in 1961
1961 establishments in Iowa
HKI